Rock Edge is a  geological Site of Special Scientific Interest in Oxford in Oxfordshire. It is a Geological Conservation Review site and a Local Nature Reserve

This site exposes limestone rich in coral called Coral rag, laid down when the area was under a warm, shallow sea, similar to the Bahama Banks today. It is rich in fossils derived from the coral reefs. It dates to the Upper Jurassic, around 145 million years ago.

References

Sites of Special Scientific Interest in Oxfordshire

Local nature reserves in Oxfordshire 
Geological Conservation Review sites